Golden Sting is a 2018 Czech sport romantic drama directed by Radim Špaček.

Cast
 Filip Březina as František Prokeš
 Ondřej Malý as Hrabal
 Stanislav Majer as Valenta
 Patrycja Volny as Michelle
 Zdeněk Piškula as Jan Sedlák
 Jiří Roskot as Emil Jelen
 Chantal Poullain-Polívková
 Andrey Bestchastny as Soviet coach

References

External links
 

2018 films
Czech sports drama films
Czech romantic drama films
2018 romantic drama films
2010s Czech-language films
2010s sports drama films